Calyce bicolor is a species of beetle in the Calyce genus. It was found in 1922.

References

Mordellidae
Beetles described in 1922